Modern Minds and Pastimes is the second studio album by The Click Five. It was released on June 26, 2007. The album contains four singles "Jenny", "Happy Birthday", "Empty" and "Flipside".

It was well received in Southeast Asia although the album only reached position #136 in the US Billboard 200 albums chart.

Track listing

Personnel
Kyle Patrick - lead vocals, rhythm guitar
Joe Guese - lead guitar, backing vocals
Ben Romans - keyboards, backing vocals
Ethan Mentzer - bass, backing vocals
Joey Zehr - drums, percussion, backing vocals

References

2007 albums
The Click Five albums
Lava Records albums